Major-General Sir George Henry Waller, 3rd Baronet (2 September 1837 – 9 October 1892) was a British Army officer who served as commanding officer of the 7th Regiment of Foot.

Military career
Waller was commissioned into the 7th Regiment of Foot on 10 August 1854 and saw action in the Crimean War. He became commanding officer of the regiment in October 1871 and was promoted to major-general on 7 April 1886. He married Beatrice Katherine Frances, daughter of Christopher Tower; they had two sons and two daughters. He lived at Woodcote in Warwickshire.

References

British Army generals
Baronets in the Baronetage of the United Kingdom
1837 births
1892 deaths